Dream Life is a Canadian drama film, directed by Mireille Dansereau and released in 1972. The first narrative fiction feature film from Quebec to be directed by a woman, the film stars Liliane Lemaître-Auger and Véronique Le Flaguais as Isabelle and Virginie, colleagues at a film production company in Montreal, who dream of finding the perfect man but come to realize that reality doesn't live up to their fantasies. It was the first privately produced feature film in Canada to be directed by a woman.

The film won two Canadian Film Awards at the 24th Canadian Film Awards in 1972, for Best Editing (Danielle Gagné) and the Wendy Michener Award.

It was later screened at the 1984 Festival of Festivals as part of Front & Centre, a special retrospective program of artistically and culturally significant films from throughout the history of Canadian cinema.

References

Works cited

External links
 

1972 films
1972 drama films
Canadian drama films
Films directed by Mireille Dansereau
1970s French-language films
French-language Canadian films
1970s Canadian films